The John Inskeep Homestead is a historic house located at 70 North Locust Road within the Marlton section of Evesham Township in Burlington County, New Jersey. It was added to the National Register of Historic Places on August 26, 1993, for its significance in architecture, commerce and community development from 1771 to 1810. The house is part of the Historic Resources of Evesham Township, New Jersey Multiple Property Submission (MPS).

See also
 National Register of Historic Places listings in Burlington County, New Jersey

References

External links
 

Evesham Township, New Jersey
National Register of Historic Places in Burlington County, New Jersey
Houses on the National Register of Historic Places in New Jersey
New Jersey Register of Historic Places
Houses in Burlington County, New Jersey
Houses completed in 1771